Daniel Dawid Trojanowski (born 24 July 1982) is a Polish rower. He competed at the 2004, 2008, 2012 and 2016 Olympic Games. He has won two gold medals (2007 World Championships, 2009 European Rowing Championships), four silver medals and two bronze medals.

References

External links
 

1982 births
Living people
Polish male rowers
Olympic rowers of Poland
Rowers at the 2004 Summer Olympics
Rowers at the 2008 Summer Olympics
Rowers at the 2012 Summer Olympics
Rowers at the 2016 Summer Olympics
People from Brodnica County
Sportspeople from Kuyavian-Pomeranian Voivodeship
Coxswains (rowing)
World Rowing Championships medalists for Poland
European Rowing Championships medalists